Neocalyptis magnilabis is a moth of the family Tortricidae. It is found in Vietnam.

The wingspan is 15 mm. The ground colour of the forewings is creamish brown, with brownish dots and suffusions. The markings are brown with blackish brown dots and a subapical blotch divided into two parts. The hindwings are pale brownish.

Etymology
The specific name refers to the size of the labis and is derived from Latin magnus (meaning large).

References

Moths described in 2009
Neocalyptis
Moths of Asia
Taxa named by Józef Razowski